Destiny Line is the debut studio album by American-born Japanese pop singer Leah Dizon. It was released on September 12, 2007 by Victor Entertainment. Dizon herself also wrote or co-wrote 10 of the tracks.

Tie-ups and theme songs
 "Softly" — was used as the Terebi Tokyo TV show Webtama's ending theme song.
 "恋しよう♪" — was used for a Lotte Rich Fruits Chocolate (Strawberry/Raspberry) TV ad as well as the music.jp CM.
 "Could you be that one?" — was used in the TV ad for the PlayStation 3 game titled Ninja Gaiden Sigma.
 "L・O・V・E U" — was used as the Shueisha magazine PINKY's CM song.
 "Are you feelin' for me?" — was used in the Lotte Rich Fruits Chocolate (European Pear) TV ad.

Dizon starred in all of the ads.

Music videos
There are a total of 5 music videos (also known as PVs) on the album. They are "Softly", "Everything Anything", "Koi Shiyō♪", "L・O・V・E U", and "Again and Again". The DVD edition also comes with an exclusive interview with Dizon and a behind the scenes look of the album titled "Real Peek". "Again and Again" is a special album PV. It was used to promote the album.

CD track listing

DVD track listing

Oricon sales charts (Japan)

Singles - Oricon Sales Chart (Japan)

2007 albums
Victor Entertainment albums